Muğancıq, Mughanjik, Moghanjiq:

Muğancıq Müslüm  
Muğancıq Mehrab 
Mughanjik 
Mughanjugh 
Moghanjiq 
Moghanjiq, West Azerbaijan